Younes Jaele (was born 1962 in Tabriz, East Azerbaijan) is an Iranian investor, businessman and entrepreneur. He is owner of Shirin Asal Food Industrial Group. He is a six-time exporter of the year in Iran and the first national sample entrepreneur. 8,760 people work directly in production lines or at their stores. Its products are exported to 65 countries. Jaele is the only Iranian representative of nine elite World Islamic Economic in Islamic countries' trade conference in Kuala Lumpur.

References

External links
 Association of Iranian Confectionery Manufacturing Companies
 Green Economics Magazine 

Living people
1962 births
Iranian company founders
Iranian businesspeople
People from Tabriz